The Corin Dam is an earth and rockfill embankment dam with an uncontrolled side channel spillway across the Cotter River, located within Namadgi National Park in the Australian Capital Territory, Australia. The impounded reservoir is called the Corin Reservoir which is a supply source of potable water for the city of Canberra and its environs. It is named after William Corin (1867–1929), a pioneer in hydroelectric development in Australia.

Location and features
Constructed by Thiess Bros Pty Limited working from designs prepared by the Commonwealth Department of Works, the Corin Dam was completed and opened in 1968.

Water from the Corin, together with the Bendora (downstream) are pumped to the suburbs of Canberra via the Bendora Gravity Main.

See also

 List of dams and reservoirs in the Australian Capital Territory
Corin Forest

References

External links

Dams completed in 1961
Dams in the Australian Capital Territory
Embankment dams
Rock-filled dams
Murray-Darling basin